Triviella ovulata, common name "baby's toes", is a species of small sea snail, a marine gastropod mollusc in the family Triviidae, the trivias.

Distribution
This snail is known around the South African coast from the Cape Peninsula to Coffee Bay in depths of 8–30 m. This species is endemic to the area.

Description
Triviella ovulata has a plump, round, white to deep pink shell. In life the shell is usually completely covered with the white mantle, which is variably spotted with black. It reaches a maximum size of 40 mm.

Ecology
This snail is usually found among colonial ascidians, on which it feeds. The snail first drills a hole in the wall of the colony, then eats its fill and finally lays its capsule-shaped egg cases in the resulting cavity. The black-spotted form of this animal resembles Mandela's nudibranch, Mandelia mirocornata, which may cause fish predators to avoid it.

References

Triviidae
Gastropods described in 1810